Queens Reach is the last arm of the Jervis Inlet and is located within the Coast Mountain Range of British Columbia, Canada.

See also
List of fjords in Canada

References

Fjords of British Columbia
Coast of British Columbia
Sunshine Coast Regional District
New Westminster Land District
Inlets of British Columbia